Run for Cover is the fifth solo studio album by Northern Irish guitarist Gary Moore, released on 2 September 1985. It is often considered his breakthrough album.

The album includes the top 5 single "Out in the Fields" and a re-recording of the song "Empty Rooms", originally from Moore's previous album Victims of the Future, which became one of Moore's biggest solo successes, reaching No. 23 on the UK charts.

The album features many of Moore's musical friends, including Deep Purple bassist/vocalist Glenn Hughes, Paul Thompson of Roxy Music and Phil Lynott from Thin Lizzy. Lynott and Moore trade lead vocals on "Out in the Fields", while Lynott sings alone on "Military Man", an old Grand Slam track. "Out in the Fields" is about the turmoil in their native Ireland. Lynott also provided vocals for a re-recording of the Thin Lizzy classic "Still in Love with You", on which Moore originally played guitar; the track was initially issued as a B-side of "Out in the Fields", but is included on later remastered versions of the album.

Track listings

Personnel
All credits adapted from the original CD release.
Gary Moore – guitar, lead vocals on tracks 1, 4, 6, 8 and 10, backing vocals, producer on tracks 3 and 11-13
Glenn Hughes – bass guitar on tracks 1, 2, 6, 7 and 9, lead vocals on tracks 2, 5, 7, 9
Phil Lynott – bass guitar on tracks 3, 5, 11-13, lead vocals on tracks 3 and 11, co-lead vocals on tracks 6 and 12, backing vocals on track 7
Andy Richards – keyboards on tracks 1-6, 8, 10
Neil Carter – keyboards on tracks 5, 7, 8, 10-13, backing vocals on tracks 1, 4, 7, 8, 10-13
Don Airey – keyboards on tracks 3 and 6
Bob Daisley – bass guitar on track 8
Gary Ferguson – drums on tracks 1, 8, 9
Charlie Morgan – drums and electronic drums on tracks 2, 3, 6
Paul Thompson – drums on tracks 5, 7, 11-13
James "Jimbo" Barton – sampled drums on track 4
Keith Murrell - backing vocals on track 7 (uncredited)

Production
Andy Johns – producer on tracks 1, 2 and 9
Peter Collins – producer on tracks 4 and 6
Beau Hill – producer on tracks 5 and 7
Mike Stone – producer on tracks 8 and 10, mixing on tracks 1, 2, 7 and 9
Stephen BenBen – engineer on tracks 3, 5 and 7
James "Jimbo" Barton – engineer and mixing assistant on tracks 4 and 6
Stuart Breed – assistant engineer on tracks 1, 2, 7, 9 and 10
Mark Saunders – assistant engineer on tracks 8 and 10
Tony Platt – engineer and mixing on tracks 11-13
Part Rock management - management

Charts

Album

Singles

Certifications

References

1985 albums
Gary Moore albums
Albums produced by Andy Johns
Albums produced by Beau Hill
Albums produced by Mike Stone (record producer)
Albums produced by Peter Collins (record producer)
Virgin Records albums